The 2014 Texas State Bobcats baseball team represents Texas State University in the 2014 intercollegiate baseball season. Texas State competes in Division I of the National Collegiate Athletic Association (NCAA) in its inaugural season as a member of the Sun Belt Conference. The Bobcats play home games at Bobcat Ballpark on the university's campus in San Marcos, Texas. Fifteenth year head coach Ty Harrington leads the Bobcats.

Personnel

Coaches

Players

Schedule

Notes

References

External links
 Official website

Texas State Bobcats baseball seasons
Texas State
Texas State